The Marciana Library or  Library of Saint Mark (but in historical documents commonly referred to as ) is a public library in Venice, Italy. It is one of the earliest surviving public libraries and repositories for manuscripts in Italy and holds one of the world's most significant collections of classical texts. It is named after St Mark, the patron saint of the city.

The library was founded in 1468 when the humanist scholar Cardinal Bessarion, bishop of Tusculum and titular Latin patriarch of Constantinople, donated his collection of Greek and Latin manuscripts to the Republic of Venice, with the stipulation that a library of public utility be established. The collection was the result of Bessarion's persistent efforts to locate rare manuscripts throughout Greece and Italy and then acquire or copy them as a means of preserving the writings of the classical Greek authors and the literature of Byzantium after the fall of Constantinople in 1453. His choice of Venice was primarily due to the city's large community of Greek refugees and its historical ties to the Byzantine Empire. The Venetian government was slow, however, to honour its commitment to suitably house the manuscripts with decades of discussion and indecision, owing to a series of military conflicts in the late-fifteenth and early-sixteenth centuries and the resulting climate of political uncertainty. The library was ultimately built during the period of recovery as part of a vast programme of urban renewal aimed at glorifying the republic through architecture and affirming its international prestige as a centre of wisdom and learning.

The original library building is located in Saint Mark's Square, Venice's former governmental centre, with its long façade facing the Doge's Palace. Constructed between 1537 and 1588, it is considered the masterpiece of the architect Jacopo Sansovino and a key work in Venetian Renaissance architecture. The Renaissance architect Andrea Palladio described it as "perhaps the richest and most ornate building that there has been since ancient times up until now". The art historian Jacob Burckhardt regarded it as "the most magnificent secular Italian building", and Frederick Hartt called it "one of the most satisfying structures in Italian architectural history". Also significant for its art, the library holds many works by the great painters of sixteenth-century Venice, making it a comprehensive monument to Venetian Mannerism.

Today, the building is customarily referred to as the '' and is largely a museum. Since 1904, the library offices, the reading rooms, and most of the collection have been housed in the adjoining Zecca, the former mint of the Republic of Venice. It is the only official institution established by the Venetian Republican government that survives and continues to function.

Historical background

Cathedral libraries and monastic libraries were the principal centres of study and learning throughout Italy in the Middle Ages. But beginning in the fifteenth century, the humanist emphasis on the knowledge of the classical world as essential to the formation of the Renaissance man led to a proliferation of court libraries, patronized by princely rulers, several of which provided a degree of public access. In Venice, an early attempt to found a public library in emulation of the great libraries of Antiquity was unsuccessful, as Petrarch's personal collection of manuscripts, donated to the republic in 1362, was dispersed at the time of his death.

In 1468, the Byzantine humanist and scholar Cardinal Bessarion donated his collection of 482 Greek and 264 Latin codices to the Republic of Venice, stipulating that a public library be established to ensure their conservation for future generations and availability for scholars. The formal letter announcing the donation, dated 31 May 1468 and addressed to Doge Cristoforo Moro and the Senate, narrates that following the fall of Constantinople in 1453 and its devastation by the Turks, Bessarion had set ardently about the task of acquiring the rare and important works of ancient Greece and Byzantium and adding them to his existing collection so as to prevent the further dispersal and total loss of Greek culture. The cardinal's stated desire in offering the manuscripts to Venice specifically was that they should be properly conserved in a city where many Greek refugees had fled and which he himself had come to consider "another Byzantium".

Bessarion's first contact with Venice had been in 1438 when, as the newly ordained metropolitan bishop of Nicaea, he arrived with the Byzantine delegation to the Council of Ferrara-Florence, the objective being to heal the schism between the Catholic and Orthodox churches and unite Christendom against the Ottoman Turks. His travels as envoy to Germany for Pope Pius II brought him briefly to the city again in 1460 and 1461. On 20 December 1461, during the second stayover, he was admitted into the Venetian aristocracy with a seat in the Great Council.

In 1463, Bessarion returned to Venice as the papal legate, tasked with negotiating the republic's participation in a crusade to liberate Constantinople from the Turks. For the duration of this extended sojourn (1463–1464), the cardinal lodged and studied in the Benedictine monastery of San Giorgio Maggiore, and it was to the monastery that he initially destined his Greek codices which were to be consigned after his death. But under the influence of the humanist Paolo Morosini and his cousin Pietro, the Venetian ambassador to Rome, Bessarion annulled the legal act of donation in 1467 with papal consent, citing the difficulty readers would have had in reaching the monastery, located on a separate island. The following year, Bessarion announced instead his intention to bequeath his entire personal library, both the Greek and Latin codices, to the Republic of Venice with immediate effect.

On 28 June 1468, Pietro Morosini took legal possession of Bessarion's library in Rome on behalf of the republic. The bequest included the 466 codices which were transported to Venice in crates the next year. To this initial delivery, more codices and incunabula were added following the death of Bessarion in 1472. This second shipment, arranged in 1474 by Federico da Montefeltro, departed from Urbino, where Bessarion had deposited the remainder of his library for safekeeping. It included the books that the cardinal had reserved for himself or had acquired after 1468.

Despite the grateful acceptance of the donation by the Venetian government and the commitment to establish a library of public utility, the codices remained crated inside the Doge's Palace, entrusted to the care of the state historian under the direction of the procurators of Saint Mark de supra. Little was done to facilitate access, particularly during the years of the conflict against the Ottomans (1463–1479) when time and resources were directed towards the war effort. In 1485, the need to provide greater space for governmental activities led to the decision to compress the crates into a smaller area of the palace where they were stacked, one atop the other. Access became more difficult and on-site consultation impracticable. Although codices were periodically loaned, primarily to learned members of the Venetian nobility and academics, the requirement to deposit a security was not always enforced. A few of the codices were subsequently discovered in private libraries or even for sale in local book shops. In exceptional circumstances, copyists were allowed to duplicate the manuscripts for the private libraries of influential patrons: among others Lorenzo de' Medici commissioned copies of seven Greek codices. During this period, reproduction of the manuscripts was rarely authorized for printers who needed working copies on which to write notes and make corrections whenever printing critical editions, since it was believed that the value of a manuscript would greatly decline once the editio princeps (first edition) had been published. Notably, Aldus Manutius was able to make only limited use of the codices for his publishing house.

Several prominent humanists, including Marcantonio Sabellico in his capacity as official historian and Bartolomeo d'Alviano, urged the government over time to provide a more suitable location, but to no avail. The political and financial situation during the long years of the Italian Wars stymied any serious plan to do so, notwithstanding the Senate's statement of intent in 1515 to build a library. Access to the collection itself was nevertheless improved after the appointment of Andrea Navagero as official historian and gubernator (curator) of the collection. During Navagero's tenure (1516–1524), scholars made greater use of the manuscripts and copyists were authorized with more frequency to reproduce codices for esteemed patrons, including Pope Leo X, King Francis I of France, and Cardinal Thomas Wolsey, Lord High Chancellor of England. More editions of the manuscripts were published in this period, notably by Manutius’ heirs. With the nomination of Pietro Bembo as gubernator in 1530 and the termination of the War of the League of Cognac in that same year, efforts to gather support for the construction of the library were renewed. Probably at the instigation of Bembo, an enthusiast of classical studies, the collection was transferred in 1532 to the upper floor of the Church of Saint Mark, the ducal chapel, where the codices were uncrated and placed on shelves. That same year, Vettore Grimani pressed his fellow procurators, insisting that the time had come to act on the republic's long-standing intention to construct a public library wherein Bessarion's codices could be housed.

Building

Construction

The programme was intended to heighten Venetian self-confidence and reaffirm the republic's international prestige after the earlier defeat at Agnadello during the War of Cambrai and the subsequent Peace of Bologna, which sanctioned Habsburg hegemony on the Italian peninsula at the end of the War of the League of Cognac. Championed by the Grimani family, it called for the transformation of Saint Mark's Square from a medieval town centre with food vendors, money changers, and even latrines into a classical forum. The intent was to evoke the memory of the ancient Roman Republic and, in the aftermath of the Sack of Rome in 1527, to present Venice as Rome's true successor. This would visually substantiate Venetian claims that, despite the republic's relative loss of political influence, its longevity and stability were assured by its constitutional structure, consisting in a mixed government modelled along the lines of the classical republics.

Monumental in scale, the architectural programme was one of the most ambitious projects of urban renewal in sixteenth-century Italy. In addition to the mint (begun 1536) and the loggia of the bell tower of Saint Mark's (begun 1538), it involved replacing the dilapidated thirteenth-century buildings that lined the southern side of the square and the area in front of the Doge's Palace. For this, the procurators of Saint Mark de supra commissioned Jacopo Sansovino, their proto (consultant architect and buildings manager), on 14 July 1536. A refugee from the Sack of Rome, Sansovino possessed the direct knowledge and understanding of ancient Roman prototypes necessary to carry out the architectural programme.

The commission called for a model of a three-storey building, but the project was radically transformed. On 6 March 1537, it was decided that the construction of the new building, now with only two storeys, would be limited to the section directly in front of the palace and that the upper floor was to be reserved for the offices of the procurators and the library. This would not only satisfy the terms of the donation, it would bring renown to the republic as a centre of wisdom, learning, and culture. Significantly, the earlier decree of 1515, citing as examples the libraries in Rome and in Athens, expressly stated that a perfect library with fine books would serve as an ornament for the city and as a light for all of Italy.

Sansovino's superintendence (1537–)
Construction proceeded slowly. The chosen site for the library, although owned by the government, was occupied by five hostelries (Pellegrino, Rizza, Cavaletto, Luna, Lion) and several food stalls, many of which had long-standing contractual rights. It was thus necessary to find a mutually agreed upon alternative location, and at least three of the hostelries had to remain in the area of Saint Mark's Square. In addition, the hostelries and shops provided a steady flow of rental income to the procurators of Saint Mark de supra, the magistrates responsible for the public buildings around Saint Mark's Square. So there was the need to limit the disruption of the revenue by gradually relocating the activities as the building progressed and new space was required to continue.

The lean-to bread shops and a portion of the Pellegrino hostelry adjoining the bell tower were demolished in early 1537. But rather than reutilizing the existing foundations, Sansovino built the library detached so as to make the bell tower a freestanding structure and transform Saint Mark's Square into a trapezoid. This was intended to give greater visual importance to the Church of Saint Mark located on the eastern side.

Work was suspended following the Ottoman–Venetian War (1537–1540) due to lack of funding but resumed in 1543. The next year, 1544, the rest of the Pellegrino hostelry was torn down, followed by the Rizza. On 18 December 1545, the heavy masonry vault collapsed. In the subsequent enquiry, Sansovino claimed that workmen had prematurely removed the temporary wooden supports before the concrete had set and that a galley in the basin of Saint Mark, firing her cannon as a salute, had shaken the building. Nevertheless, the architect was sentenced to personally repay the cost of the damage, which took him 20 years. Further, his stipend was suspended until 1547. As a consequence of the collapse, the design was modified with a lighter wooden structure to support the roof.

In the following years, the procurators increased funding by borrowing from trust funds, recovering unpaid rents, selling unprofitable holdings, and drawing upon the interest income from government bonds. Work proceeded rapidly thereafter. The Cavaletto hostelry was relocated in 1550. This was followed by the demolition of the Luna. By 1552, at least the seven bays in correspondence to the reading room, had been completed. The commemorative plaque in the adjacent vestibule, corresponding to the next three bays, bears the date of the Venetian year 1133 (i.e. 1554), an indication that the end of construction was already considered imminent. By then, fourteen bays had been constructed. However, owing to difficulties in finding a suitable alternative location, only in 1556 was the last of the hostelries, the Lion, relocated, allowing the building to reach the sixteenth bay in correspondence with the lateral entry of the mint. Beyond stood the central meat market. This was a significant source of rental income for the procurators, and construction was halted. The work on the interior decorations continued until about 1560. Although it was decided five years later to relocate the meat market and continue the building, no further action was taken, and in 1570 Sansovino died.

Scamozzi's superintendence (1582–1588)
The meat market was demolished in 1581. The following year Vincenzo Scamozzi was selected to oversee the construction of the final five bays, continuing Sansovino's design for the façade. This brought the building down to the embankment of Saint Mark's Basin and into alignment with the main façade of the mint. Scamozzi added the crowning statues and obelisks. Since the original plans by Sansovino do not survive, it is not known whether the architect intended for the library to reach the final length of twenty-one bays. Scamozzi's negative comment on the junction of the library with the mint has led some architectural historians to argue that the result could not have been intentionally designed by Sansovino. However archival research and technical and aesthetic assessments have not been conclusive.

During Scamozzi's superintendence, the debate regarding the height of the building was reopened. When Sansovino was first commissioned on 14 July 1536, the project expressly called for a three-storey construction similar to the recently rebuilt Procuratie Vecchie on the northern side of Saint Mark's Square. But by 6 March 1537, when the decision was made to locate the library within the new building, the plan was abandoned in favour of a single floor above the ground level. Scamozzi, nonetheless, recommended adding a floor to the library. Engineers were called to assess the existing foundation to determine whether it could bear the additional weight. The conclusions were equivocal, and it was ultimately decided in 1588 that the library would remain with only two floors.

Architecture

Upper floor

The upper storey is characterized by a series of Serlians, so-called because the architectural element was illustrated and described by Sebastiano Serlio in his Tutte l'opere d'architettura et prospetiva, a seven-volume treatise for Renaissance architects and scholarly patrons. Later popularized by the architect Andrea Palladio, the element is also known as the Palladian window. It is inspired by ancient triumphal arches such as the Arch of Constantine and consists in a high-arched opening that is flanked by two shorter sidelights topped with lintels and supported by columns. From his days in Florence, Sansovino was likely familiar with the Serlian, having observed it in the tabernacle of the Merchants’ guild by Donatello and Michelozzo on the façade of the Church of Orsanmichele. He would have undoubtedly seen Donato Bramante's tripartite window in the Sala Regia of the Vatican during his Roman sojourn and may have been aware of the sixteenth-century nymphaeum at Genazzano near Rome, attributed to Bramante, where the Serlian is placed in a series. At the Marciana, Sansovino adopted the contracted Serlian of the Orsanmichele prototype, which has narrow sidelights, but these are separated from the tall opening by double columns, placed one behind the other. This solution of the narrow sidelights ensured greater strength to the structural walls, which was necessary to balance the thrust of the barrel vault originally planned for the upper storey.

Layered over the series of Serlians is a row of large Ionic columns. The capitals with the egg-and-dart motif in the echinus and flame palmettes and masks in the collar may have been directly inspired by the Temple of Saturn in Rome and perhaps by the Villa Medicea at Poggio a Caiano by Giuliano da Sangallo. For the bases, as a sign of his architectural erudition, Sansovino adopted the Ionic base as it had been directly observed and noted by Antonio da Sangallo the Younger and Baldassare Peruzzi in ancient ruins at Frascati. The idea of an ornate frieze above the columns with festoons alternating with window openings had already been used by Sansovino for the courtyard of Palazzo Gaddi in Rome (1519–1527). But the insertion of windows into a frieze had been pioneered even earlier by Bramante at Palazzo Caprini in Rome (1501–1510, demolished 1938) and employed in Peruzzi's early sixteenth-century Villa Farnesina. In the library, the specific pattern of the festoons with putti appears to be based on an early second-century sarcophagus fragment belonging to Cardinal Domenico Grimani's collection of antiquities.

Ground floor

The ground floor is modelled on the Theatre of Marcellus and the Colosseum in Rome. It consists in a succession of Doric columns supporting an entablature and is layered over a series of arches resting on pillars. The combination of columns layered over an arcade had been proposed by Bramante for the Palazzo di Giustizia (unexecuted), and was employed by Antonio da Sangallo the younger for the courtyard of Palazzo Farnese (begun 1517). In adopting the solution for the Marciana Library, Sansovino was faithfully adhering to the recommendation of Leon Battista Alberti that in larger structures the column, inherited from Greek architecture, should only support an entablature, whereas the arch, inherited from Roman mural construction, should be supported on square pillars so that the resulting arcade appears to be the residual of "a wall open and discontinued in several places".

According to the architect's son, Francesco, Sansovino's design for the corner of the Doric frieze was much discussed and admired for its faithful adherence to the principles of Ancient Roman architecture as outlined by Vitruvius in De architectura. These principles required that a triglyph be centred over the last column and then followed by half a metope, but the space was insufficient. With no surviving classical examples to guide them, Bramante, Antonio da Sangallo the Younger, Raphael, and other great Renaissance architects had struggled with the dilemma, implementing various ideas, none of which satisfied the Vitruvian dictum. Sansovino's solution was to lengthen the end of the frieze by placing a final pilaster on a wider pier, thus creating the space necessary for a perfect half metope. Francesco Sansovino relates that his father additionally sensationalized the design by challenging the leading architects in Italy to resolve the problem and then triumphantly revealing his own solution.

Carvings
Rather than a two-dimensional wall, the façade is conceived as an assemblage of three-dimensional structural elements, including piers, arcades, columns, and entablatures layered atop one another to create a sense of depth, which is increased by the extensive surface carvings. These are the work of Sansovino's collaborators, including Danese Cattaneo, Pietro da Salò, Bartolomeo Ammannati, and Alessandro Vittoria. Male figures in high relief are located in the spandrels on the ground floor. With the exception of the arch in correspondence to the entry of the library which has Neptune holding a trident and Aeolus with a wind-filled sail, these figures represent allegories of non-specific rivers, characterized by the cornucopias and the urns with water flowing out. The enlarged keystones of the arches on the ground floor alternate between lions’ heads and the heads of pagan divinities (Ceres?, Pan, Apollo, Diana, Mercury, Minerva, Venus, Mars, Juno?, Jupiter, Saturn, and Phanes). In low relief, the underarches have either mythological scenes, mostly related to the divinity in the keystone, or grotesques. The spandrels on the upper floor have allegorical female figures with wings. These are in mid relief, thus creating the illusion that they are further from the viewer. The upright structural axes, consisting of the succession of columns and pedestals, become progressively lighter. This all serves to emphasize the verticality and counterbalance the long, horizontal succession of arcades.

The balustrade above is surmounted by statues of pagan divinities and immortalized heroes of Antiquity. Built by Scamozzi between 1588 and 1591 following Sansovino's design, this solution for the roofline may have been influenced by Michelangelo's designs for the Capitoline Hill in Rome and may have later inspired Scamozzi's own work at the Teatro Olimpico in Vicenza. Among the sculptors were Agostino and Vigilio Rubini, Camillo Mariani, Tiziano Aspetti, and Girolamo Campagna. Over time, however, several of the original statues were eroded or otherwise damaged and ultimately replaced with statues that are not always consistent with the original subjects.

The effect of the library, overall, is that the entire façade has been encrusted with archaeological artefacts. Statues and carvings abound, and there are no large areas of plain wall. In addition to the abundance of classical decorative elements – obelisks, keystone heads, spandrel figures, and reliefs – the Doric and Ionic orders, each with the appropriate frieze, cornice, and base, follow ancient Roman prototypes, giving the building a sense of authenticity. The proportions, however, do not always respect Vitruvian canons. Scamozzi, a rigid classicist, was critical of the arches on the ground floor, considered to be dwarfed and ill-proportioned, and the excessive height of the Ionic entablature with respect to the columns. Nevertheless, the classical references were sufficient to satisfy the Venetians’ desire to emulate the great civilizations of Antiquity and to present their own city as the successor of the Roman Republic. At the same time, the design respects many local building traditions and harmonizes with the gothic Doge's Palace through the common use of Istrian limestone, the two-storey arcades, the balustrades, and the elaborate rooflines.

Interior
The library historically occupied the upper floor, while the ground floor was let to shops, and later cafes, as sources of revenue to the procurators. The gilded interior rooms are decorated with oil paintings by the masters of Venice's Mannerist period, including Titian, Tintoretto, Paolo Veronese, and Andrea Schiavone. Some of these paintings show mythological scenes derived from the writings of classical authors: Ovid's Metamorphoses and Fasti, Apuleius's The Golden Ass, Nonnus's Dionysiaca, Martianus Capella's The Marriage of Philology and Mercury, and the Suda. In many instances, these stories of the pagan divinities are employed in a metaphorical sense on the basis of the early Christian writings of Arnobius and Eusebius. Other paintings show allegorical figures and include Renaissance hieroglyphics, consisting in symbols of plants, animals, and objects with specific, but enigmatic, meanings. They reflect the particular interest in the esotericism of the Hermetic writings and the Chaldean Oracles that enthused many humanists following the publication in 1505 of Horapollo's Ἱερογλυφικά, the book discovered in 1419 by Cristoforo Buondelmonti and believed to be the key for deciphering ancient Egyptian hieroglyphics.

The "Mantegna Tarocchi" were used as iconographic sources for the depictions of the liberal arts and the muses in the staircase.

Although several images have a specific pedagogical function aimed at forming temperate and stalwart rulers and inculcating qualities of dedication to duty and moral excellence in the noble youth who studied in the library, the overall decorative programme reflects the Venetian aristocracy's interest in philosophy as an intellectual pursuit and, in a broader sense, the growing interest in Platonic philosophy as one of the central currents in Renaissance thought. It is conceptually organized on the basis of the Neoplatonic ascent of the soul and affirms that the quest for knowledge is directed towards the attainment of divine wisdom. The staircase largely represents the life of the embodied soul in the early stages of the ascent: the practice of the cardinal virtues, the study and contemplation of the sensible world in both its multiplicity and harmony, the transcendence of mere opinions (doxa) through dialectic, and catharsis. The reading room corresponds to the soul's subsequent journey within the intellectual realm and shows the culmination of the ascent with the awakening of the higher, intellective soul, ecstatic union, and illumination. The programme culminates with the representation of the ideal Platonic State founded upon a transcendent understanding of a higher reality. By association, it is implied that the Republic of Venice is the very paradigm of wisdom, order, and harmony.

Staircase
The staircase consists of four domes (the Dome of Ethics, the Dome of Rhetoric, the Dome of Dialectic, and the Dome of Poetics) and two flights, the vaults of which are each decorated with twenty-one images of alternating quadrilinear stuccoes by Alessandro Vittoria and octagonal frescoes by Battista Franco (first flight) and Battista del Moro (second flight). At the entry and on the landings, Sansovino repeated the Serlian element from the façade, making use of ancient columns taken from the dilapidated sixth-century Byzantine Church of Santa Maria del Canneto in Pola on the Istrian peninsula.

Vestibule
The vestibule was conceived as a lecture hall for the public school of Saint Mark. Founded in 1446 to train civil servants for the Ducal Chancery, the school initially focused on grammar and rhetoric. With the addition of a second lectureship for poetry, oratory, and history in 1460, it evolved into a humanistic school, principally for the sons of the nobles and citizens. Among the Italian humanists who taught there were George of Trebizond, Giorgio Valla, Marcantonio Sabellico, Raphael Regius, and Marco Musuro. The vestibule additionally hosted the meetings of the Accademia Veneziana from 1560 until the academy's dissolution for bankruptcy the following year.

The room was originally lined with wooden benches, interrupted by a lectern that was located under the central window of the western wall. Beginning in 1591, it was transformed into the public Statuary Hall by Vincenzo Scamozzi in order to display the collection of ancient sculpture that Giovanni Grimani had donated to the Venetian Republic in 1587. Of the original decoration, only the ceiling remains with the illusionistic three-dimensional decoration by Cristoforo and Stefano De Rosa of Brescia (1559). Titian's octagonal painting in the centre has most often been identified as a personification of Wisdom or History. Other suggestions include Poetry, Philosophy, Rhetoric, and Love of Letters.

Reading Room
The adjacent reading room originally had 38 desks in the centre, arranged in two rows, to which the valuable codices were chained according to subject matter. Between the windows were imaginary portraits of great men of Antiquity, the 'philosophers', each originally accompanied by an identifying inscription. Similar portraits were located in the vestibule. Over time, however, these paintings were moved to various locations within the library and eventually, in 1763, to the Doge's Palace in order to create the wall space necessary for more bookshelves. As a result, some were lost along with all of the identifying inscriptions. The ten that survive were returned to the library in the early nineteenth century and integrated with other paintings in 1929. Of the 'philosophers', only Diogenes by Tintoretto has been credibly identified.

The ceiling of the reading room is decorated with 21 roundels, circular oil paintings, by Giovanni de Mio, Giuseppe Salviati, Battista Franco, Giulio Licinio, Bernardo Strozzi, Giambattista Zelotti, Alessandro Varotari, Paolo Veronese, and Andrea Schiavone. They are inserted into a gilded and painted wooden framework along with 52 grotesques by Battista Franco. The roundels by Bernardo Strozzi and Alessandro Varotari are replacements from 1635 of earlier roundels, respectively by Giulio Licinio and Giambattista Zelotti, which were irreparably damaged by water infiltrations. The original roundels were commissioned in 1556.

Although the original seven artists were formally chosen by Sansovino and Titian, their selection for an official and prestigious commission such as the library was indicative of the ascendancy of the Grimani and of those other families within the aristocracy who maintained close ties with the papal court and whose artistic preferences consequently tended towards Mannerism as it was developing in Tuscany, Emilia, and Rome. The artists were mostly young and innovative. They were primarily foreign-trained and substantially outside the Venetian tradition in their artistic styles, having been influenced by the trends in Florence, Rome, Mantua, and Parma, particularly by the work of Michelangelo, Giulio Romano, and Parmigianino. To varying degrees, the roundels that they produced for the ceiling of the reading room are consequently characterized by the emphasis on line drawing, the greater sculptural rigidity and artificial poses of the figures, and the overall dramatic compositions. They nevertheless show the influence of the Venetian painting tradition in both the colouring and brushwork.

For the single roundels, various and conflicting titles have been proposed over time. The earliest titles that Giorgio Vasari suggested for the three roundels by Veronese contain conspicuous errors, and even the titles and visual descriptions given by Francesco Sansovino, son of the architect, for all 21 roundels are often imprecise or inaccurate.

CEILING OF THE READING ROOM
with Francesco Sansovino's titles/descriptions and the more recent proposals

KEY: (S) = Sansovino, 1581    (I) = Ivanoff, 1967    (P) = Paolucci, 1981    (H) = Hope, 1990    (B) = Broderick, 2016

Later history

Venetian administration
Created in 1517, the  had initially been tasked with reopening the University of Padua after its closure during the years of the War of Cambrai. This involved repairing physical damage to the buildings, hiring new professors, and organizing courses. Over time, their role came to encompass virtually all aspects of public education. Preparations were made to move the manuscripts and books from the upper floor of Saint Mark's to the new building: the effective date of the transfer is not known from any surviving documents, but it must have occurred between 1559 and 1565, probably prior to July 1560. For the loaning of the valuable codices, the Council of Ten established stricter conditions which included the requirement of a deposit in gold or silver in the amount of 25 ducats. The sum, already substantial, was increased to 50 ducats in 1558.

Beginning in 1558, the  nominated the librarian, a patrician chosen for life. But in 1626, the Senate once again assumed direct responsibility for the nomination of the librarian, whose term was limited by the Great Council in 1775 to three years. With few exceptions, the librarians were typically chosen from among the procurators of Saint Mark.

The reform of 1626 established the positions of custodian and attendant, both subordinate to the librarian, with the requirement that the custodian be fluent in Latin and Greek. The attendant was responsible for the general tidiness of the library and was chosen by the procurators, the riformatori, and the librarian. To the custodian fell the responsibility for opening and closing the library: opening days (Monday, Wednesday, and Friday mornings) were also fixed whereas access had previously been by appointment only. The custodian assisted readers, including the international scholars attracted by the importance of the manuscripts. Among these were Willem Canter, Henry Savile, Jacques Gaffarel, and Thomas van Erpe.

The custodian was additionally tasked with showing the library to foreigners who visited primarily to admire the structure and the manuscripts, commenting in their travel diaries on the magnificence of the building, the ancient statuary, the paintings, and on the codices themselves. Notably among these were the English travel-writer Thomas Coryat, the French archaeologist Jacob Spon, the French architect Robert de Cotte, and the German art historian Johann Joachim Winckelmann.

In 1680, the Senate accepted the recommendation of the librarian, the future Doge Silvestro Valier, to better protect the codices by removing them from their chains and putting them inside cabinets. In place of the earlier benches, four large tables were set up for consultation. Further, it was decided to limit loaning, but the library was to now be open daily.

Developments in library science in the eighteenth century led to increased efforts to organize and protect the manuscripts. Under the influence of important royal libraries, notably in Paris and Vienna, the bindings of all manuscripts were standardized, and an identifying ex libris was added so as to underscore the unity and prestige of the overall collection and its ownership by the republic. Modern catalogues were compiled by the scholarly custodian Antonio Maria Zanetti. These catalogues, printed in 1740 and 1741, largely adhered to the bibliographical guidelines of Bernard de Montfaucon for the library of Henry-Charles de Coislin, bishop of Metz, and identified the shelf mark of each manuscript along with an indication of its age and origin, a physical description, and a list of the texts it contained.

French and Austrian administrations
After the fall of the Venetian Republic to the French in 1797, the position of librarian, as with all government offices, ceased to exist. The custodian Jacopo Morelli became by default librarian.

In 1811, the entire collection was moved to the former Hall of the Great Council in the Doge's Palace when the library, as a building, was transformed, together with the adjoining Procuratie Nuove, into an official residence for the viceroy of the Napoleonic Kingdom of Italy.

Italian administration

In 1876, after the Third Italian War of Independence and the annexation of Venice to the Kingdom of Italy, the Marciana was designated as a national library, a title that recognizes the library's historical importance but does not involve particular legal jurisdiction within the Italian library system. Several other libraries share this title, but only two, the libraries in Rome and in Florence, constitute the national central library with the requirement of legal deposit for all publications printed in Italy. The Marciana receives copies of the books that are printed by local publishers.

The collection was moved from the Doge's Palace to the Zecca, the former mint, in 1904. It is Italian national property, and the library is a state library that depends upon the General Direction for Libraries and Authors' Rights of the Ministry of Cultural Heritage and Activities and Tourism. The General Direction provides financial support and administrative assistance. The Central Institute for Archive and Book Pathology specifically gives guidance with regard to the preservation and restoration of parchment and paper. The Marciana also participates in the National Library Service of Italy which seeks to standardize cataloguing among public, private, and university libraries through the Central Institute for the Union Catalogue of Italian Libraries and for Bibliographic Information. This involves the creation of a single database for the collections held by the various institutions.

Under Italy, the '' passed to the Italian Crown, which ceded ownership to the state in 1919. The Marciana came into possession of the historical rooms of the library in 1924. These underwent extensive restoration and were reopened to the public in 1929 as a museum.

Collection

The Venetian government viewed the possession of the valuable codices as a source of civic pride and prestige for the republic. Little was done initially to facilitate public access to the library or to improve services to readers. Inventories were sporadically conducted, but no acquisition policy was established for the continued incrementation of the collection. Only two new manuscripts, both donations, entered into the library before the inventory of 1575. Although an attempt was made in 1603 to increase the library's holdings by legally requiring that a copy of all books printed within the territory of the Venetian Republic be henceforth deposited in the Marciana, the law had little initial effect due to lack of enforcement. Similarly disregarded was the Senate's decree in 1650, requiring that the procurators allocate funds annually for the acquisition of new books. Nevertheless, a series of individual bequests began in 1589 and greatly expanded the collection over time. The requirement for printers to deposit copies of new books was also increasingly enforced, beginning in the early eighteenth century. In addition, from 1724 onward, the Senate appropriated annual funding for the acquisition of newly printed foreign books so as to ensure that the collection remained up-to-date. Concurrently, the library began to sell books of marginal interest or little value, primarily books obligatorily deposited by printers, and then use the proceeds to purchase works of cultural importance in order to maintain the quality of the overall collection.

Bessarion's Library

The private library of Cardinal Bessarion constitutes the historical nucleus of the Marciana. In addition to liturgical and theological texts for reference, Bessarion's library initially reflected his particular interests in ancient Greek history, Platonic philosophy, and science, especially astronomy. Some of these texts were brought by Bessarion when he arrived in Italy (1438) for the Council of Ferrara-Florence; others were shipped at an unknown later date from the Venetian city of Modone (Methoni), near Mystras where Bessarion had studied under Gemistus Pletho. Among the early codices were works by Cyril of Alexandria, Euclid, Ptolemy, and Strabo, some of which were rare, if not unknown, in Western Europe. Elevated to the cardinalate in 1440, Bessarion enjoyed greater financial resources, and he added notable codices, including the precious tenth-century manuscripts of Alexander of Aphrodisias' works and of Ptolemy's Almagest that had once belonged to the library of Pope Boniface VIII.

Around 1450, Bessarion began to place his ecclesiastical coat of arms on his books and assign shelf marks, an indication that the collection was no longer limited to personal consultation but that he intended to create a lasting library for scholars. In 1454, following the fall of Constantinople to the Ottoman Turks (1453) and the ensuing devastation, he charged Michael Apostolius and Theophanes, bishop of Athens, with the task of locating and purchasing specific works throughout Greece, primarily in Adrianople, Athens, Thessaloniki, Aenos, Gallipoli, and Constantinople, with the objective of preserving the writings of the classical Greek authors and the literature of Byzantium. He also established a scriptorium on Crete, under the direction of Apostolius, where hired scribes copied the texts that could not be found for purchase. A similar scriptorium existed in his Roman residence where other texts were copied. Many of the originals were borrowed for this purpose from the monastery of Santa Croce di Fonte Avellana (Marche) and from several Basilian monasteries in southern Italy, of which Bessarion was nominated protector and apostolic visitor in 1446. Copies of Augustine's complete works were commissioned from the bookseller Vespasiano da Bisticci.

Bessarion acquired several works from Giovanni Aurispa and later from his nephew and heir Nardo Palmieri. These works include the Anthologia Planudea containing 2400 Greek poems, the only autograph copy of the commentary on Homer's Odyssey by Eustathius of Thessalonica, the orations of Demosthenes, Roman History by Cassius Dio, the Bibliotheca of Photius, and the only surviving copy of Deipnosophistae by Athenaeus. "Venetus A" and "Venetus B", the oldest texts of Homer's Iliad, with centuries of scholia, may have also been acquired from Aurispa.

Simultaneously, Bessarion assembled a parallel collection of Latin codices with a relative preponderance of works on patrology, philosophy (primarily the medieval Platonic and Aristotelian traditions), history, mathematics, and literature. Some of these were purchased during his residence in Bologna (1450–1455) or copied from originals in San Giovanni Evangelista (Ravenna), including the works by Quintilian, Lactantius, Augustine, and Jerome. Of particular interest to Bessarion were the Latin historiographers. Among these were Livy and Tacitus. The Latin codices also included translations of Greek works, commissioned by Bessarion. Other Latin codices were purchased during his legation to Germany (1460–1461), notably exegetical and theological works by Nicholas of Lyra and William of Auvergne.

Towards the end of his life, printed books became increasingly available, and Bessarion began to add incunabula to his library, primarily from the printing house of Arnold Pannartz and Konrad Sweynheim in Rome. These books included works by Cicero, Plutarch, Pliny, Quintilian, and Thomas Aquinas as well as the Latin translation of Bessarion's own work in defence of Plato, Adversus calumniatorem Platonis (1469).

The Marciana Library now possesses 548 Greek codices, 337 Latin codices, and 27 incunabula that once belonged to Cardinal Bessarion. Among these are codices with works of Middle Platonic and Neoplatonic authors, many of which constitute the most important, if not the sole, surviving source for their writings.

Additions

Major additions include:
 1589 – Melchiorre Guilandino of Marienburg: the bequest of the Prussian-born doctor and botanist, director of the botanical gardens at the University of Padua and professor of botany and pharmacognosy, consisted of 2,200 printed books dealing with philosophy, medicine, mathematics, botany, theology, literature, poetry, and history.
 1595 – Jacopo Contarini da S. Samuele: the bequest of the Venetian patrician, delayed until the extinction of the male line of the Contarini in 1713, consisted of 175 Greek and Latin manuscripts and 1,500 printed books and included works on Venetian history, Law, poetry, naval and military matters, astronomy, physics, optics, architecture, and philosophy.
 1619 – Girolamo Fabrici d'Acquapendente: the bequest of the surgeon and professor of anatomy at the University of Padua consisted of 13 volumes with hand-coloured anatomical illustrations.
 1624 – Giacomo Gallicio: the donation consisted of 21 Greek codices, comprising over 90 works, dealing primarily with exegetics, philology, and philosophy.
 1734 – Giambattista Recanati: the bequest of the Venetian noble poet and man of letters, member of both the Florentine Academy and the Royal Society of London, consisted of 216 Greek, Latin, Italian, French, Franco-Venetian, and Illyric manuscripts, among which were several medieval illuminated manuscripts once belonging to the House of Gonzaga.
 1792 – Tommaso Giuseppe Farsetti: the bequest of the Venetian patrician consisted of 386 Latin and Italian manuscripts and over 1600 printed books, primarily literature.
 1794 – Amedeo Schweyer, called "Svajer": the purchase of the collection of the German-born antiquarian involved more than 340 manuscripts and included genealogies and Venetian and foreign documents, among which is the last will and testament of Marco Polo.
 1797 – Jacopo Nani: the bequest of the Venetian collector consisted of 716 Greek, Latin, Italian, French, Arabic, Egyptian, Persian, Syrian, and Turkish manuscripts covering history, travel, literature, politics, science, military matters, architecture, philosophy, and religion.
 1814 – Girolamo Ascanio Molin: the bequest of the Venetian nobleman, collector and author, included 2209 fine printed books and incunabula, 3835 prints, 408 drawings, and 136 maps.
 1843 – Girolamo Contarini: the bequest of the Venetian nobleman consisted of some 4000 printed books and 956 manuscripts, including 170 musical codices.
 1852 – Giovanni Rossi: the bequest consisted of 470 manuscripts dealing primarily with Venetian history and a collection of Venetian operas.

Three hundred and three precious manuscripts along with 88 rare printed books were transferred to the Marciana in 1789 from the religious libraries of Santi Giovanni e Paolo, Sant'Andrea della Certosa, and S. Pietro Martire di Murano by order of the Council of Ten after an investigation into a theft revealed unsatisfactory security conditions. Between 1792 and 1795, the Council of Ten also transferred to the Marciana works from its Secret Archives that were no longer considered politically sensitive. These included the scientific writings of Tycho Brahe and Cesare Cremonini, originally presented to the Inquisition for concerns over religious orthodoxy, as well as political documents of historical interest.

After the fall of the Venetian Republic to Napoleon in 1797, 470 precious manuscripts, selected from public, religious, and private libraries throughout Venice, were turned over to the French as prizes of war. Of these, 203 were subtracted from the Marciana along with two musical scores. Similarly, during the first period of Austrian occupation (1798–1805), six rare incunabula and 10 important manuscripts were removed. However, the Marciana obtained 4,407 volumes including 630 manuscripts when during the second period of French occupation (1805–1815), numerous convents and monasteries were suppressed and their libraries dispersed. In 1811, the map of Fra Mauro was transferred from the suppressed Camaldolese monastery of San Michele in Isola.

As of 2019, the collection consists of 13,117 manuscripts; 2,887 incunabula; 24,060 cinquecentine; and 1,000,000 (circa) post-sixteenth-century books. Overall, the Marciana remains specialized in the classics, the humanities, and Venetian history.

See also
 Laurentian Library
 Malatestiana Library
 Vatican Library

References

Notes

Citations

Bibliography

External links

  
 Catalogue of Greek codices 
 Catalogue of Latin codices (includes French and Italian codices) 

Archives in Italy
Buildings and structures in Venice
Jacopo Sansovino buildings
Marciana
Museums in Venice
National libraries in Italy
Piazza San Marco
Renaissance architecture in Venice
Libraries established in the 15th century